Dwight Elmo Jones (February 27, 1952 – July 25, 2016) was an American professional basketball player. A 6'10" forward/center, he was the leading scorer and rebounder on the 1972 Olympic team that lost the controversial gold medal game to the Soviet Union. Jones was ejected from the gold medal game after an altercation with a Soviet player. Later it was revealed that the Soviets intentionally provoked him as they saw him as the leader of the U.S. team and wanted to get him out.

Jones attended E.O. Smith Education Center and Wheatley High School.

After playing college basketball at the University of Houston from 1970–73, Jones was selected as the 9th overall pick in 1973 NBA Draft by the Atlanta Hawks. Jones played for ten seasons in the NBA from 1973 to 1983 with four teams: Atlanta, the Houston Rockets, the Chicago Bulls, and the Los Angeles Lakers. The 6 ft 10 in power forward/center averaged 8.1 points in 766 career regular season games.

His son, Dwight Jones II, played at Houston Baptist University. A 6-3 guard, Jones II was named the Red River Athletic Conference Player of the Year in 2005-06 and 2006-07 while also being named an NAIA All-America both seasons.

Jones died on July 25, 2016.

References

External links
 
 Career NCAA stats @ thedraftreview.com

1952 births
2016 deaths
African-American basketball players
American expatriate basketball people in Italy
American men's basketball players
Atlanta Hawks draft picks
Atlanta Hawks players
Basketball players at the 1971 Pan American Games
Basketball players at the 1972 Summer Olympics
Basketball players from Houston
Centers (basketball)
Chicago Bulls players
Houston Cougars men's basketball players
Houston Rockets players
Los Angeles Lakers players
Medalists at the 1972 Summer Olympics
Olympic silver medalists for the United States in basketball
Pallacanestro Trieste players
Parade High School All-Americans (boys' basketball)
Power forwards (basketball)
United States men's national basketball team players
Pan American Games competitors for the United States
20th-century African-American sportspeople
21st-century African-American people